Odomari/Otomari  may refer to:

Ōdomari, former name of Korsakov, administrative center of Korsakovsky District, Sakhalin Oblast, Russia
Japanese icebreaker Ōtomari, an icebreaker of the Imperial Japanese Navy serving during the 1920s through World War II

ja:大泊